Jéssica Bruin Cavalheiro (born August 1, 1991 in Belo Horizonte, Minas Gerais, Brazil), is a Brazilian Olympic swimmer.

International career

2011–12

Integrating Brazil national delegation that disputed the 2011 Pan American Games in Guadalajara, Mexico, won the silver medal in the 4×200-metre freestyle relay. She was also in the 200-metre freestyle final, finishing in 6th place.

2013–16

At the 2013 World Aquatics Championships in Barcelona, she finished 10th in the 4×200-metre freestyle, along with Manuella Lyrio, Carolina Bilich and Larissa Oliveira.

At the 2014 FINA World Swimming Championships (25 m) in Doha, Qatar, Cavalheiro finished 18th in the Women's 400 metre freestyle and 23rd in the Women's 200 metre freestyle.

At the 2015 Pan American Games in Toronto, Ontario, Canada, Cavalheiro won the silver medal in the 4 × 200 metre freestyle relay, breaking the South American record, with a time of 7:56.36, along with Larissa Oliveira, Manuella Lyrio and Joanna Maranhão.

At the 2015 World Aquatics Championships in Kazan, Cavalheiro finished 10th in the Women's 4 × 200 metre freestyle relay, along with Manuella Lyrio, Joanna Maranhão and Larissa Oliveira.

2016 Summer Olympics

At the 2016 Summer Olympics, in the Women's 4 × 200 metre freestyle relay, she broke the South American record, with a time of 7:55.68, along with Manuella Lyrio, Gabrielle Roncatto and Larissa Oliveira, finishing 11th.

References

1991 births
Living people
Sportspeople from Belo Horizonte
Brazilian female freestyle swimmers
Swimmers at the 2011 Pan American Games
Swimmers at the 2015 Pan American Games
Pan American Games silver medalists for Brazil
Swimmers at the 2016 Summer Olympics
Olympic swimmers of Brazil
Pan American Games medalists in swimming
South American Games gold medalists for Brazil
South American Games bronze medalists for Brazil
South American Games medalists in swimming
Competitors at the 2014 South American Games
Medalists at the 2011 Pan American Games
Medalists at the 2015 Pan American Games
21st-century Brazilian women